Zelma Davis is a Liberian-born American singer-songwriter. She is primarily known for her number-one dance hits "Things That Make You Go Hmmm..." and "Just a Touch of Love" with C+C Music Factory. She has won four American Music Awards, five Billboard Music Awards, two MTV Video Music Awards, and a Grammy Award nomination with the group.

Career
Upon C+C Music Factory's emergence onto the scene in late 1990, Davis was marketed as the principal vocalist of the ensemble—despite there having been several other female vocalists, in addition to her, who had provided the vocals to various tracks on the group's debut album, Gonna Make You Sweat.   Davis appeared in the music video for the album's number-one Hot 100-charting title track, where she lip-synched to vocals which had, in fact, been sung by Martha Wash.

Wash (who had also provided vocals to Black Box during the same period, and also saw that group use models to lip-sync to her voice in the music videos) did not appreciate the perception of Davis being the voice behind the hit song, and proceeded to file a lawsuit against the group. With this happening during the height of the Milli Vanilli lip-synching scandal, Davis found herself being accused of being a "no talent" who was being featured by the group only because of her looks – despite her having actually performed a number of songs on their studio album Gonna Make You Sweat.

In 1992, she made an appearance on the American sitcom "Blossom". In 1993, Davis performed a rendition of Dennis Edwards's song "Don't Look Any Further" for Dave Koz's album Lucky Man. In 1994, Davis reunited with C+C Music Factory to record their second album, Anything Goes!. The album's lead single "Do You Wanna Get Funky", which featured Davis and Martha Wash, peaked at number-one on Billboard's Dance chart. Davis also appears on the song "I Found Love".

In 1997, she released a song called "I'm Calling (Say It Loud)" on the soundtrack for the documentary film, When We Were Kings. In 2000, Davis released a single called "Power", which peaked at number-one on Billboard's Hot Dance Maxi-Singles Sales.

In June 2008, Davis appeared on DJ Heavygrinder's single "Mind Reader". In August 2008, Zelma Davis and Amber released a remake of Donna Summer and Barbra Streisand's "No More Tears (Enough Is Enough)". In 2009, she released another single with DJ Heavygrinder called "Chains of Love". In 2010, she released three singles: "Free Love", "Touch the Sky", and "Summer of Love".

In January 2015, she released a single with Dank called "1994 (Rhythm Is Right)". In 2017, Davis appeared in the TV series "Dr. Ken".

Discography

Singles

Awards and nominations
American Music Awards

Grammy Music Awards

MTV Video Music Awards

Note: These are nominations Davis shares with the C+C Music Factory.

See also
List of number-one dance hits (United States)
List of artists who reached number one on the U.S. Dance chart

References

Columbia Records artists
House musicians
Living people
American people of Liberian descent
Americo-Liberian people
20th-century African-American women singers
African-American women singer-songwriters
1970 births
20th-century American women singers
20th-century American singers
21st-century American women singers
21st-century American singers
21st-century African-American women singers
C+C Music Factory members